Made in Hong Kong (香港製造) is a 1997 Hong Kong drama film written and directed by Fruit Chan, executive produced and produced by Andy Lau and starring Sam Lee, Yim Hui-Chi, Wenders Li, and Tam Ka-Chuen.  It won the Best Picture Award at the 1998 Hong Kong Film Awards along with 13 other wins and 6 nominations. The film was selected as the Hong Kong entry for the Best Foreign Language Film at the 71st Academy Awards, but was not accepted as a nominee.

Much of the film is set in subsidised housing projects, which Chan considered to be 'a very Hong Kong thing' due to the high population density of the region. Though the film is sometimes regarded as a response to the 1997 Hong Kong handover, Chan feels that Made in Hong Kong can also be viewed as a character-driven drama that reflects the lifestyle of many young Hong Kong people at the time.

The film was made using leftover film reels and therefore had very low production costs, even for an independent movie.

Plot
The narrator, Autumn Moon, is a high school drop-out whose father has abandoned his family for his mistress. He has nightmares about a classmate who committed suicide along with constant wet dreams after coming into possession of a love letter belonging to her. Moon works with his friend, Sylvester who is retarded, as a debt collector for a Triad member and falls for Ping, the daughter of a debtor. She has a fatal kidney disease, so the teenager accepts an assassination contract to pay her medical fees. When Ping and Sylvester are dead, Moon decides to take revenge on the world before committing suicide.

Cast and roles
 Sam Lee - To Chung-Chau, 'Moon'
 Neiky Yim Hui-Chi - Lam Yuk-Ping, 'Ping'
 Wenders Li - Ah-Lung, 'Sylvester' (credited as Wenbers Li Tung-Chuen)
 Amy Tam Ka-Chuen - Hui Bo San, 'Susan'
 Carol Lam Kit-Fong - Mrs. Lam, Ping's mother
 Doris Chow Yan-Wah - Mrs. To, Moon's mother
 Siu Chung - Ms. Lee, social worker
 Chan Tat-Yee - Fat Chan
 Wu Wai-Chung - Keung
 Sang Chan - 'Big Brother', Cheung Siu-Wing
 Kelvin Chung - Doctor
 Ah Ting - Moon's father
 Jessica - Moon's father's current wife
 Ah Wai - Assassin on skateboard
 Ho B-Chai - Male student

See also
 List of submissions to the 71st Academy Awards for Best Foreign Language Film
 List of Hong Kong submissions for the Academy Award for Best Foreign Language Film

References

External links
 
Made in Hong Kong Review at BBC FOUR

1997 films
1997 drama films
Hong Kong drama films
Best Film HKFA
Films produced by Andy Lau
Films directed by Fruit Chan
Films whose director won the Best Director Golden Horse Award
1990s Hong Kong films